In algebraic number theory, the Hilbert class field E of a number field K is the maximal abelian unramified extension of K.   Its degree over K equals the class number of K and the Galois group of E over K is canonically isomorphic to the ideal class group of K using Frobenius elements for prime ideals in K.

In this context, the Hilbert class field of K is not just unramified at the finite places (the classical ideal theoretic interpretation) but also at the infinite places of K. That is, every real embedding of K extends to a real embedding of E (rather than to a complex embedding of E).

Examples
If the ring of integers of K is a unique factorization domain, in particular if , then K is its own Hilbert class field.
Let  of discriminant . The field  has discriminant  and so is an everywhere unramified extension of K, and it is abelian. Using the Minkowski bound, one can show that K has class number 2. A non-principal ideal of K is (2,(1+)/2), and in L this becomes the principal ideal ((1+)/2).
The field  has class number 3. Its Hilbert class field can be formed by adjoining a root of x3 - x - 1, which has discriminant -23.
To see why ramification at the archimedean primes must be taken into account, consider the real quadratic field K obtained by adjoining the square root of 3 to Q. This field has class number 1 and discriminant 12, but the extension K(i)/K of discriminant 9=32 is unramified at all prime ideals in K, so K admits finite abelian extensions of degree greater than 1 in which all finite primes of K are unramified.   This doesn't contradict the Hilbert class field of K being K itself: every proper finite abelian extension of K must ramify at some place, and in the extension K(i)/K there is ramification at the archimedean places: the real embeddings of K extend to complex (rather than real) embeddings of K(i).
By the theory of complex multiplication, the Hilbert class field of an imaginary quadratic field is generated by the value of the elliptic modular function at a generator for the ring of integers (as a Z-module).

History

The existence of the Hilbert class field is a valuable tool in studying the structure of the ideal class group of a given field.

Additional properties

The Hilbert class field E also satisfies the following:
E is a finite Galois extension of K and [E : K] = hK, where hK is the class number of K.
The ideal class group of K is isomorphic to the Galois group of E over K.
Every ideal of OK extends to a principal ideal of the ring extension OE (principal ideal theorem).
Every prime ideal P of OK decomposes into the product of  hK / f prime ideals in OE, where f is the order of [P] in the ideal class group of OK.

In fact, E is the unique field satisfying the first, second, and fourth properties.

Explicit constructions
If K is imaginary quadratic and A is an elliptic curve with complex multiplication by the ring of integers of K, then adjoining the j-invariant of A to K gives the Hilbert class field.

Generalizations
In class field theory, one studies the ray class field with respect to a given modulus, which is a formal product of prime ideals (including, possibly, archimedean ones). The ray class field is the maximal abelian extension unramified outside the primes dividing the modulus and satisfying a particular ramification condition at the primes dividing the modulus. The Hilbert class field is then the ray class field with respect to the trivial modulus 1.

The narrow class field is the ray class field with respect to the modulus consisting of all infinite primes.

Notes

References
 
 

 J. S. Milne, Class Field Theory (Course notes available at http://www.jmilne.org/math/).  See the Introduction chapter of the notes, especially p. 4.

 

Class field theory